Herbert Francis Benning OBE (1907-8 February 1990) was an Australian rugby league player and Administrator.

Playing career
Benning was a forward that played with the University for five seasons between 1926 and 1930.

Benning played for University in the 1926 NSWRL grand final against South Sydney which University lost 11–5 at the Royal Agricultural Society Grounds in front of 20,000 spectators.

Administrative career
After excelling at Rugby League he became interested in administration, and he became the club secretary of the University club in 1930, a position that he retained until the club folded in 1937. He was awarded an OBE in 1969 for services to the community.

Death
Benning died on 8 February 1990, aged 82.

References

1907 births
1990 deaths
Sydney University rugby league team players
Australian rugby league players
Rugby league hookers
Rugby league second-rows
Rugby league players from New South Wales